The Georgian Ice Hockey National Federation (GIHNF) is the governing body of ice hockey in Georgia. The federation was founded in 2004 by Denis Davidov and Lasha Tsagareishvili. In 2009 Georgia joined the International Ice Hockey Federation (IIHF) as an associate member. The Georgian Ice Hockey League was started in 2007. Shortly after being accepted into the IIHF both Davidov and Tsagareishvili, along with four others (including the president of the Ice Hockey Federation of Armenia) were killed in a car accident, forcing the Georgian Ice Hockey Federation to delay plans to start a national team. Georgia joined the International Ice Hockey Federation (IIHF) on 8 May 2009.

National teams
Men's national team

Participation by year
2017

2018

References

External links
 Official site of the Georgian Ice Hockey National Federation
 Georgia at IIHF.com

2004 establishments in Georgia (country)
Ice hockey governing bodies in Europe
Ice hockey in Georgia (country)
International Ice Hockey Federation members
Ice Hockey
Sports organizations established in 2004